Leninsky City District is a district of the city of Barnaul, Altai Krai, Russia. Its area is ca. . Population:

References

Barnaul